The 2006–07 season was Paris Saint-Germain's 37th season in existence. PSG played their home league games at the Parc des Princes in Paris, registering an average attendance of 36,360 spectators per match. The club was presided by Alain Cayzac. The team was coached by Guy Lacombe until 15 January 2007, when Paul Le Guen replaced him. Pauleta was the team captain.

Players

As of the 2006–07 season.

Squad

Left club during season

Competitions

Overview

Trophée des Champions

Ligue 1

League table

Results summary

Results by match

Matches

Coupe de France

Coupe de la Ligue

UEFA Cup

First round

Group stage

Knockout phase

Round of 32

Round of 16

Notes and references

Notes

References

External links

Official websites
PSG.FR - Site officiel du Paris Saint-Germain
Paris Saint-Germain - Ligue 1 
Paris Saint-Germain - UEFA.com

Paris Saint-Germain
Paris Saint-Germain F.C. seasons